Nulled is an online cracking forum.

In 2016, Nulled became known as a target of a data breach which helped law enforcement to obtain information about possible 'suspects', who were registered on Nulled.

Data breach 
On 16 May 2016, Nulled was hacked and its database leaked. The leaked data contained 9.65GB of users' personal information. The leak included a complete MySQL database file which contained the website's entire data. This data breach included 4,053 user accounts, their PayPal email addresses, along with cracked passwords, 800,593 user personal messages, 5,582 purchase records and 12,600 invoices. The data breach also exposed email addresses hosted on government domains. The identity of the crew that took down Nulled's database is not known, but there was speculation that state-sponsored hackers were involved. Another article reported that a Romanian group claimed responsibility for the data breach.

References 

Crime forums